Eubranchipus serratus, the ethologist fairy shrimp, is a species of branchiopod in the family Chirocephalidae. It is found in North America.

References

Further reading

 

Anostraca
Articles created by Qbugbot
Crustaceans described in 1876